Comanche Township is a township in Barton County, Kansas, USA.  As of the 2010 census, its population was 462.

Comanche Township was organized in 1879.

Geography

The stream of Walnut Creek runs through this township.

Transportation
Comanche Township contains one airport or landing strip, Peters Landing Field.

References
 USGS Geographic Names Information System (GNIS)

External links
 US-Counties.com
 City-Data.com

Townships in Barton County, Kansas
Townships in Kansas